Caladenia orientalis, commonly known as the eastern spider orchid, is a species of orchid endemic to Victoria. It is a ground orchid with a single hairy leaf and one or two creamy-white to yellowish-green flowers and which only grows near the Mornington Peninsula.

Description 
The sepals and petals taper to thin brown to black tips. Flowering occurs from September to October, but flowering generally follows summer bushfires. This species is difficult to distinguish from Caladenia patersonii and C. fragrantissima and sometimes forms hybrids with C. tessellata.

Taxonomy and naming 
This orchid was first formally described in 2001 by Stephen Hopper and Andrew Phillip Brown and the description was published in the Indigenous Flora and Fauna Association Miscellaneous Paper 1. In 2004, Stephen Hopper and Andrew Phillip Brown raised the species to Caladenia orientalis and published the change in Australian Systematic Botany. The specific epithet (orientalis) is a Latin word meaning "of the east".

Distribution and habitat 
Although its former distribution was wider, in 2010 surveys revealed the eastern spider orchid to only occur between Port Campbell and Yarram in the South East Coastal Plain biogeographic region where it grows in coastal heath and woodland with a heathy understorey.

Conservation
Caladenia orientalis is classified as "endangered" under the Victorian Government Flora and Fauna Guarantee Act 1988 and the Australian Government Environment Protection and Biodiversity Conservation Act 1999. The main threats to the species include land clearing, trampling and inappropriate fire regimes. Experiments in Wilsons Promontory National Park have shown that fencing significantly reduces the incidence of grazing of this species.

References

orientalis
Orchids of Victoria (Australia)
Endemic orchids of Australia
Plants described in 2001